Air Jaws is a series of fourteen TV specials about great white sharks that have aired on Discovery Channel's Shark Week. The specials are mainly filmed in the Indian Ocean off the coast of South Africa, many on Seal Island in False Bay, near Cape Town, or in Mossel Bay.

Episode list
 Air Jaws: Sharks of South Africa (2001)
 Air Jaws II: Even Higher (2002)
 Ultimate Air Jaws (2010)
 Air Jaws Apocalypse (2012)
 Air Jaws: Fin of Fury (2014)
 Air Jaws: Walking with Great Whites (2015)
 Air Jaws: Night Stalker (2016)
 Air Jaws: The Hunted (2018)
 Air Jaws: Back from the Dead (2018)
 Air Jaws Strikes Back (2019)
 Air Jaws Ultimate Breach Off (2020)
 Air Jaws 2020 (2020)
 Air Jaws: Going for Gold (2021)
 Air Jaws: Top Guns (2022)

Home media

References

Discovery Channel original programming
Films about sharks